Aerenicella spissicornis is a species of beetle in the family Cerambycidae, and the only species in the genus Aerenicella. It was described by Henry Walter Bates in 1881.

References

Aerenicini
Beetles described in 1881